Sarai is an elevated station on the Violet Line of the Delhi Metro. It is located between Badarpur and NHPC Chowk station on the line 6 in Faridabad district of Haryana.

The station

Station layout

Facilities

Entry/Exit

Connections

Buses 
Department of State Transport Haryana runs buses between
Ballabgarh Bus Stand – Panipat
Ballabgarh Bus Stand – Sonipat
Cyber City – Sector 37 Faridabad
Medanta Medicity – Sector 37 Faridabad
and bus route number CS-1A, CS-1B, CS-1C, CS-13A, CS-13B, CS-14A, CS-14B from outside metro station stop.

See also 

Delhi
Faridabad
Haryana
List of Delhi Metro stations
Transport in Delhi
Delhi Metro Rail Corporation
Delhi Suburban Railway
Delhi Monorail
Delhi Transport Corporation
Faridabad district
New Delhi
National Capital Region (India)
National Capital Region Transport Corporation
List of rapid transit systems
List of metro systems

References

External links 

 Delhi Metro Rail Corporation Ltd. (Official site)
 Delhi Metro Annual Reports
 
 UrbanRail.Net – Descriptions of all metro systems in the world, each with a schematic map showing all stations.

Delhi Metro stations
Railway stations in India opened in 2015
Railway stations in Faridabad district
2015 establishments in Haryana
Caravanserais in India